The Craig yr Hafod Tramroad was a  gauge plateway for horse-drawn trams in Monmouthshire, Wales. It connected a limestone quarry at Craig-yr-hafod high on the eastern flanks of Mynydd y Garn-fawr with the (then) Brecknock and Abergavenny Canal between Llanellen and Llanover. It was operated by the Cwm Llanellen Lime and Coal Company from about 1812 though it is not known when operations ceased.

Though it ran to the canal and was constructed under the Brecknock and Abergavenny Act of 1797 which allowed for tramroad development in association with this waterway, it does not appear to have been intended to connect with it but rather to have served limekilns which stand near to the canal, to the consternation of the Brecknock and Abergavenny Canal Company. The tramroad as a whole appears to have been lightly constructed and the lack of visible wear on extant blocks suggests its use was limited. The gauge appears to have been 2 ft 9ins with individual tramplates 3 ft 1.5ins long; a curved plate in Abergavenny Museum probably originates from this tramroad.

References

Horse-drawn railways
Transport in Monmouthshire
Railway lines opened in 1812
Early British railway companies
Blaenavon